Sørbyhaugen is a former subway station on the Oslo Metro.

The station was located between Smestad and Makrellbekken, and was opened when the Røa Line was created, as an extension from Smestad to Røa on 24 January 1935. From 1942 it was the point from which the Kolsås Line branched off the Røa Line, offering a T-bane connection into the neighboring municipality Bærum. It was closed as a part of the Røa Line overhaul in 1995.

References

Oslo Metro stations in Oslo
Railway stations opened in 1935
Railway stations closed in 1995
Disused Oslo Metro stations
1935 establishments in Norway
1995 disestablishments in Norway